Roy McKay may refer to:
 Roy McKay (baseball)
 Roy McKay (American football)
 Roy McKay (footballer)